Trapezniki is a rural locality (a village) in Oshibskoye Rural Settlement, Kudymkarsky District, Perm Krai, Russia. The population was 34 as of 2010.

Weather 
Between 5°c to 9°c in day time and 10°c to 18°c in night time.

Geography 
Trapezniki is located 30 km north of Kudymkar (the district's administrative centre) by road. Fadeyeva is the nearest rural locality.

References 

Rural localities in Kudymkarsky District